Gausvik Church is a parish church of the Church of Norway in Harstad Municipality in Troms og Finnmark county, Norway. It is located in the village of Gausvik on the east side of the island of Hinnøya. It is one of the churches in the Sandtorg parish which is part of the Trondenes prosti (deanery) in the Diocese of Nord-Hålogaland. The concrete and wood church was built in a rectangular style in 1979 using plans drawn up by the architect Nils Toft. The church seats about 160 people.

See also
List of churches in Nord-Hålogaland

References

Harstad
Churches in Troms
20th-century Church of Norway church buildings
Churches completed in 1979
1979 establishments in Norway
Concrete churches in Norway
Rectangular churches in Norway